Joseph Badger (c. 1707–1765) was a portrait artist in Boston, Massachusetts, in the 18th century. He was born in Charlestown, Massachusetts, to tailor Stephen Badger and Mercy Kettell. He "began his career as a house-painter and glazier, and ... throughout his life continued this work, besides painting signs, hatchments and other heraldic devices, in order to eke out a livelihood when orders for portraits slackened." In 1731 he married Katharine Felch; they moved to Boston around 1733.  He was a member of the Brattle Street Church. He died in Boston on May 11, 1765, when "on Saturday last one Mr. Badger, of this Town, Painter, was taken with an Apoplectic Fit as he was walking in his Garden, and expired in a few Minutes after." Works by Badger are in the collections of the Worcester Art Museum, the Museum of Fine Arts Boston, and Historic New England's Phillips House, Salem, Mass. While respected in his own time, subsequent scholars and connoisseurs largely overlooked Badger's significance until Lawrence Park wrote a book about him in 1918.

Portrait subjects
James Bowdoin (1676–1747), father of Massachusetts governor James Bowdoin
Elizabeth Campbell, wife of William Foye
William Cooper (1716–1743), pastor of the Brattle St. Church, Boston
Andrew Croswell (1709–1785), pastor of King's Chapel, Boston
Thomas Cushing (1696–1746), speaker of the Massachusetts House of Representatives, and father of Thomas Cushing
Thomas Dawes
Jonathan Edwards
Josiah Flagg & Jane Flagg Greene, descendants of Jane Franklin, sister to Benjamin Franklin
William Foye
Esther Orne Gardner (ca. 1714-1755)
Ellis Gray (1715–1753), pastor of Old North Church, Boston
John Haskins (1729–1814), grandfather of Ralph Waldo Emerson
John Homans (1753–1800), doctor
Joseph Jackson (1707–1790)
John Larrabee (1686–1792), commanding officer of Castle William, Massachusetts
Rev. Dudley Leavitt (1720–1762)
Mrs. Dudley Leavitt (née Mary Pickering) (1733–1805), sister of Timothy Pickering
Elizabeth Marion (1721–1746), wife of William Story, and grandmother of Joseph Story
John Marston (1715–1786), proprietor of Boston's Bunch-of-Grapes tavern during the Revolution
Lois Orne, wife of William Paine (physician)
Rebecca Orne
Thomas Prince
William Scott, shoemaker, Boston
Elizabeth Storer, wife of Boston merchant-shipowner Isaac Smith (1719–1787)
William Tyler (1688–1758), business partner of Thomas Hancock
Cornelius Waldo (1684–1753)
George Whitefield

Image gallery

References

Further reading
Lawrence Park. Joseph Badger (1708-1765): and a descriptive list of some of his works. 1918.
Portrait of Jeremiah Belknap by Joseph Badger. Bulletin of the Cleveland Museum of Art, Vol. 6, No. 7/8 (Sep. - Oct., 1919), pp. 123–125.
The Orne Portraits by Joseph Badger. Worcester Art Museum Bulletin v. 1, no. 2, Feb. 1972.

External links

Joseph Badger at American Art Gallery
WorldCat. Badger, Joseph 1708-1765
Worcester Art Museum, Worcester, Massachusetts. Joseph Badger (1707/8–1765).
Smithsonian American Art Museum. Inventory of works by Badger.
Butler Institute of American Art, Youngstown, Ohio. Joseph Badger.
Cleveland Museum of Art. Portrait of Jeremiah Belknap, ca. 1758.
John Singleton Copley in America, a full text exhibition catalog from The Metropolitan Museum of Art, which contains material on Joseph Badger (see index)

1707 births
1765 deaths
American portrait painters
Artists from Boston
18th-century American painters
18th-century American male artists
American male painters
18th century in Boston